Shirgerd (also Romanized as Shīrgerd) is a village in Keybar Rural District, Jolgeh Zozan District, Khaf County, Razavi Khorasan Province, Iran. At the 2006 census, its population was 64, in 15 families.

References 

Populated places in Khaf County